Rucker is a former unincorporated community in Santa Clara County, California, located halfway along the five miles of Monterey Highway between Gilroy and San Martin. The name is official, but not in common use among locals today. Supporting the name are local geographic features, Rucker Avenue, Rucker School (K-6), and Rucker Creek. The community was part of the Mexican land grant Rancho San Francisco de las Llagas.

References corroborate use of the name in 1933 to describe a siding on what is now the Union Pacific Railroad, Coast Subdivision. It still appears on modern maps.

The community is inside area codes 408 and 669 and default wired telephone service is provided by the Verizon Gilroy exchange. The district is in ZIP code 95020.

At the southern edge of the San Jose metropolitan area, the community is gradually being developed. The area has historically been agricultural, with many present-day area homes having an acre of land, or more, and horses. Homes often include mature trees and primitive barbed-wire fences. Area crops include turf, alfalfa and other irrigated row crops.

References

External links 
 1917 map of area showing "Rucker".
 Sargent's Juristac Rancho

Unincorporated communities in Santa Clara County, California
Unincorporated communities in California